Addyme  is a genus of snout moths in the subfamily Phycitinae. It was described by Francis Walker in 1863, and is known from Japan, Indonesia, Sri Lanka and Borneo.

Species
 Addyme aspiciella Ragonot, 1889 
 Addyme confusalis Yamanaka, 2006 
 Addyme ferrorubella (Walker, 1864)
 Addyme inductalis (Walker, 1863)
 Addyme werkodara Roesler & Küppers, 1979

References

Phycitini
Pyralidae genera